John Lilly may refer to:

 John C. Lilly (1915–2001), American physician, psychoanalyst and writer
 John Lilly (computer scientist) (born 1971), former chief executive officer of the Mozilla Corporation
 John Lilly (writer) (c. 1553–1606), English writer
 John Lilly (priest) (died 1825), Archdeacon of Hereford

See also
 John Lilley (disambiguation)
 John Lillie (disambiguation)